FireHouse is the debut album by American glam metal band FireHouse. Released in 1990, it launched the group into stardom. The record was certified double platinum in the United States and gold in Canada, Japan and Singapore.

Background 

Firehouse spawned four singles, "Shake & Tumble", "Don't Treat Me Bad", "All She Wrote", and the band's signature power ballad, "Love of a Lifetime".

The song "Don't Walk Away" was used in a scene of the 2008 movie The Wrestler, directed by Darren Aronofsky.

The song "Overnight Sensation" was a part of the soundtrack in the video game Brütal Legend.

The song "Don't Treat Me Bad" was featured in episode two of the HBO Max series Peacemaker, as the title character takes out the vinyl record and listens to that song.

Track listing

Certifications

Charts

Singles 
"Shake & Tumble" Didn't Chart
"Don't Treat Me Bad" #19 U.S.
"Love of a Lifetime" #5 U.S.
"All She Wrote" #58 U.S.

Personnel 
C.J. Snare – lead vocals, keyboards
Bill Leverty – guitars, backing vocals
Perry Richardson – bass, backing vocals
Michael Foster – drums, percussion, backing vocals

Production
Executive producer: Michael Caplan
Produced by David Prater
Engineered by Doug Oberkircher
Assistant engineer: Ellen Fitton
Mixed by David Prater and Doug Oberkircher

References 

FireHouse (band) albums
1990 debut albums
Epic Records albums